Kert "Kessu" Kesküla (13 January 1975 – 28 September 2011) was an Estonian basketball player.

Early life
Kesküla was born 13 January 1975 in Saue Parish. In 2001 he graduated from International University Audentes.

Career
From 1994 until 1996 he was a member of Estonian national basketball team. He also played on two teams: Baltika and TTÜ/A. Le Coq. From 2006 to 2008 he played on Finnish club Forssa Koripojat.

Death
On 26 September 2011, Kesküla, aged 36, was lured to a deserted wooded location in the Tallinn district of Lasnamäe through an internet conversation with a teenage girl who offered Kesküla sex in exchange for money. When Kesküla arrived at the location, he was beaten and stabbed to death in a planned robbery committed by the girl and three other teenage accomplices:  two boys and another girl. The four youths were arrested and charged with the murder within a week of the crime and all four were sentenced to prison. 

Kesküla was buried in Liiva Cemetery in Tallinn.

References

1975 births
2011 deaths
Estonian men's basketball players
People murdered in Estonia
Estonian murder victims
Male murder victims
2000s murders in Estonia
Burials at Liiva Cemetery
People from Saue Parish
Deaths by beating in Europe
Deaths by stabbing